Radio Dhoni is a Bangladeshi FM radio station, headquartered  in Dhaka. It started broadcasting on 14 April 2015.

References

2015 establishments in Bangladesh
Organisations based in Dhaka
Radio stations in Bangladesh
Mass media in Dhaka